Choc'late Allen (born 19 June 1993) is a child activist who arose to national awareness in early 2007 by engaging in a 5-day fast in an effort to promote the concept of “Taking Personal Responsibility” for our individual thoughts and actions. In order to treat with social issues plaguing Trinidad and Tobago. During her fasting process, the young CEO of Caribbean Vizion (a nonprofit youth organization), received visits from many citizens and dignitaries. Including then Opposition Leader Kamla Persad-Bissessar and then Prime Minister Patrick Manning.

With the various school motivational school tours and projects that Allen has embarked on during the "100% Crime Free" initiative. She is committed to her programs and always sticking to her vision of creating a peaceful society by us accepting personal responsibility for our actions. Allen also formed Youth Committees of young persons under the age of 17 who have the same goal of making a positive impact on youths and society; and who are interested in being effective, future leaders.

In 2008, Allen launched her singing career and 2008-initiative at the 15th annual Rebel Salute concert in Jamaica. Rebel Salute is a positive reggae concert held and formed by Tony Rebel and Flames Productions. The concert is one of no alcohol, no violence, no meat and no drugs. Following this event, Allen was invited by Mrs. Rita Marley to be the co-chair of the Africa Unite Youth Symposium and to perform at the Africa Unite-Smile Jamaica concert. The concert featured acts like Bunny Wailer, John Legend, Rihanna, Ziggy Marley and the Melody Makers/ The Marley brothers and other local and international artists.

Recently, in addition to the continuation of her Taking Personal Responsibility movement, as an activist, she has been visiting several schools in Jamaica; with the support of many UN agencies and other organizations. As an artist, Choc'late collaborated with Reggae artist Queen Ifrica in a song entitled "Friends". The song they Performed covers both the child and adult vision of friendship. The two performed the song at the first international night of the Reggae Summer Festival, and according to all reviews of the show, the collaboration was well received and very touching.

Biography

Choc'late is a home-schooled student, who as a toddler showed qualities of determination and enthusiasm towards learning. This led to her being a consistent A+ student and heavily involved in cultural, sporting and social activities. From 1993 to 2000, she lived in Trinidad and Tobago and was known by everyone that she met as; "A bright, intelligent, old soul; with a promising future". In 2001, Choc'late began touring the region as an actress, singer and dancer with the organization Caribbean Vizion. She was now exposed to different Caribbean cultures, history, people and was having direct contact, relations and negotiations with Prime Ministers, Presidents, Political figures, NGO's and the Private Sector. But according to Choc'late, it was at age eleven that she began to identify a direction for her existence.

In 2004, Caribbean Vizion lost its St. Lucian C.E.O – Ms. Jany Williams – to a vehicle accident that Choc'late and four other C.V cast members were involved in. After campaigning against a 34-year-old, Choc'late was elected C.E.O of the regional organization Caribbean Vizion. This position proved to bestow her with responsibilities that many of her peers didn't experience at that age.
Through Caribbean Vizion tours, Choc'late and her Caribbean colleges were able to address social issues and inspire positive changes in lives of many Caribbean People. Tours took her within schools (elementary, primary, secondary, and tertiary institutions), prisons (adult and youth correctional facilities), communities (including those that are considered "at risk"), and other institutions (children homes, institutions for the hearing and visual impaired and for the physically challenged).

After touring with Caribbean Vizion from 2001 to 2006, Allen began putting structure to her own personal passions and concerns. Without abandoning her executive position and commitment to the NGO, she created an independent movement that was fully geared toward youth vision and development. This movement, as envisioned in the creation phase, would be presented through the medium of Educulture, Music, Workshops and Social Activism.

In 2007, 13-year-old Choc'late began the year with a five-day fast at the National Library in Port of Spain, Trinidad. Inspired after reading the biography of Mahatma Gandhi, she took a personal stance against the rising crime rate in Trinidad and Tobago; and sought to send a message of peace to citizens; by rejecting food and drink for five days. During the fast, she urged the nation to take personal responsibility for their thoughts, words and actions; and work together toward positive nation building. Her stance became a national issue and inspired the youth community to break their silence and become advocates for social issues. Following her fast, she went on to conduct motivational school tours, award ceremonies, summer camps, and form youth groups that flew the TPR (Taking Personal Responsibility) flag.

In 2009, Choc'late and her organization produced an audio disk entitled "Children MUST be Seen and HEARD". This disk was the result of her "Creating a vision for our future" workshop; an extensive tour of schools, communities and institutions in all 40 parishes in Jamaica. The tour was supported by many organizations including, UNESCO, UNAIDS, UNDP, UNICEF, and UNEP, and was executed over a period of two years. The audio disk was endorsed by the then Prime Minister, Mr. Bruce Golding and then Minister of Education ,Dr. Andrew Holness, and was implemented as a training tool for teachers, guidance counselors, peer counselors, and students; in all schools on island.

From 2007 to 2011; Choc'late has been a respected as a keynote speaker, motivational idol, child/ youth activist, recording artiste, radio and television hostess, newspaper journalist, educator; and (most recently) an author. She continues to tour schools, communities, and institutions and has always maintained her position and support for the ancient concept of "Taking Personal Responsibility". The region is highly anticipating the launch of her book during 2012; which is said to recap the life of a young lady that captures our interest and hearts.

References

https://web.archive.org/web/20120424194954/http://test.guardian.co.tt/index.php?q=commentary%2Fletters%2F2010%2F01%2F12%2Fchoc-late-allen-responds-letter

https://web.archive.org/web/20120424173814/http://www.ttentonline.com/press-release/choclate-allen-co-chairs-for-the-4th-annual-africa-unite-
http://www.trinidadandtobagonews.com/blog/?p=165

https://web.archive.org/web/20111218065357/http://www.go-localjamaica.com/readarticle.php?ArticleID=10759

http://www.bahamasissues.com/showthread.php?t=7654
http://www.businesssolarpanels.org/choclate/
https://web.archive.org/web/20120426001637/http://www.everytingjamaican.com/jamaicatalk/jamaica-headline-news/20591-choclate-reads-fasts-peace-jamaica.html

https://archive.org/details/alchemystics2011-08-05.jz-bt201.flac16

Video links
 "Smile Jamaica – April 2008"		  
 "Children Must Be Seen and HEARD", YouTube	  
"Jamaica Student Endorsement 1", YouTube
"Jamaica Student Endorsement 2", YouTube
"Taking Personal Responsibility", YouTube
"Official Endorsement", YouTube
"100% Crime Free Fast", YouTube
"Why This Mission", YouTube
"Choc'late Wave – 1998", YouTube
"So Happy (E-O) – 2011", YouTube
"Friends", YouTube
"Educulture Endorsements 1", YouTube
"Educulture Endorsements 2", YouTube 
"Educulture Programme", YouTube

External links
Myspace site

1993 births
Living people
Trinidad and Tobago activists
Child activists
Trinidad and Tobago reggae musicians